Ranur Pratham Bhag is a Bengali drama film directed and produced by Nabyendu Chatterjee based on a same name story of Bibhutibhushan Mukhopadhyay. This film was released in 1972 under the banner of Mahamaya Productions. Child actress Neera Maliya received the National Award as Best Child Artist.

Plot

Cast
Ajitesh Bandyopadhyay
Gita Dey
Asit Bandopadhyay
 Dwiju Bhawal
 Neera Maliya
 Moni Srimani
 Bankim Ghosh
 Kanika Majumdar
 Nibhanani Debi

References

External links
 

1975 films
Indian children's films
Bengali-language Indian films
Indian drama films
Films based on Indian novels
1970s Bengali-language films
Films directed by Nabyendu Chatterjee